Walking After Midnight may refer to:

Walking After Midnight (1988 film), Canadian documentary film
Walking After Midnight (1992 film), Turkish film
Walkin' After Midnight, 1957 Patsy Cline song